The February 9 Killer is an unidentified suspected murderer believed to be responsible for the 2006 murder of Sonia Mejia and her unborn baby and the 2008 murder of Damiana Castillo in Salt Lake County, Utah, United States. The murders were committed on the same day, February 9, hence the name.

Investigation
In 2009, the unsolved murders of Sonia Mejia in Taylorsville and Damiana Castillo in West Valley City were linked through DNA analysis. The corresponding police departments concurrently released a description of the perpetrator as a Hispanic male in his late teens or early 20s. A 20-man task force was then formed.

, the case is classified as a cold case.

In November 2018 Salt Lake County District Attorney Sim Gill announced that a suspect was in custody in another jurisdiction and was in the process of being extradited back to Utah to face murder charges. In January 2022, the charging documents were unsealed and revealed the suspect to be 41-year-old Mexican national Juan Arreola-Murrillo, who had previous convictions for fraud in 2008 and was later deported to his homeland, where he remained until his extradition.

See also
List of fugitives from justice who disappeared

Victims
Sonia Mejia, aged 29, was raped and strangled in her apartment in Taylorsville
Damiana Castillo, aged 57, was strangled in her apartment in West Valley City

References

2006 in Utah
2006 murders in the United States
2008 in Utah
2008 murders in the United States
American male criminals
Crimes in Utah
Fugitives
Deaths by strangulation in the United States
History of women in Utah
Incidents of violence against women
Murder in Utah
Rapes in the United States
Unidentified American rapists
Unsolved murders in the United States